Alexandre Hepp (14 January 1857 – 1924) was a 19th–20th-century French novelist, journalist and drama critic.

With Henry Céard, Guy de Maupassant, Joris-Karl Huysmans and Paul Alexis, he was one of Émile Zola's disciples. He collaborated with many newspapers including Le Gaulois, L'Événement, L'Écho de Paris, Gil Blas, Le Voltaire, Le Matin and Le Figaro. Many of his columns were collected and published in volume.

Publications 

1878: Les Errantes, novel
1879: Histoire de Ruy-Blas, with Clément Clament  
1881: Les Étrangleurs de la tour Malakoff
1882: L'Amie de Mme Alice
1884: Paris patraque 
1885: Paris tout nu 
1886: Les Anges parisiens 
1888: L'Épuisé, novel
1890: Chaos, roman contemporain. Also published as feuilleton in Le Figaro from 25 February 1890 to 29 March 1890)
1897: Cœurs pharisiens (1897)
1898–1899 :Les Quotidiennes (2 volumes, 1898–1899) Text online 1 2
1891: Le Lait d'une autre
1895: Minutes d'Orient, propos de cour et paysages 
1901: Cœur d'amant, roman contemporain 
1901: Ciel de Russie 
1901: La Coupe empoisonnée
1906: L'Audacieux pardon 
1910: Ferdinand de Bulgarie intime 
1913: L'Affreuse étreinte, novel
1914: La Valise bouclée 
1916: Les Cœurs embellis, 1914–1915 Text online
1917: Les Cœurs armés. 1916
1919:Les Cœurs victorieux, 1917–1918

External links 
Une expérience de traduction, Tristan Bernard

19th-century French journalists
French male journalists
20th-century French journalists
19th-century French novelists
20th-century French novelists
1857 births
1924 deaths
Members of the Ligue de la patrie française
19th-century French male writers
20th-century French male writers